Hypolestidae is a family of damselflies in the order Odonata. There are at least four genera and about six described species in Hypolestidae.

Genera
These four genera belong to the family Hypolestidae:
 Hypolestes Gundlach, 1888
 † Anglohypolestes Nel & Fleck, 2014
 † Eohypolestes Nel & Fleck, 2014
 † Prohypolestes Nel & Paichele, 1994

References

Further reading

 
 
 
 

Odonata families